Maharshi Vidya Mandir, Rayagada (MVM) is one of the English medium high schools of Rayagada district in the Indian state of Odisha. The school is located in 2.135 acres of area towards the eastern side of the town Rayagada.

History
Established on 7 January 1992, the school is a pioneer in the field of holistic education in the Rayagada district. The school is affiliated to the Central Board of Secondary Education, New Delhi. The school is a part of  Maharishi Global Education Movement and runs under the society "Maharshi Sikshya Sansthan". The school has obtained NOC No. 30720 from the CBSE, New Delhi.

Activities
Named after the great seer Maharishi Mahesh Yogi, the School introduces Maharishi Consciousness based Education System. A center of National Institute of Open schooling functions here

The incumbency chart of the Principals of the school is as follows.

References

External links
 Official website of Rayagada district

Schools in Odisha
Education in Rayagada district
Educational institutions established in 1992
1992 establishments in Orissa